The 2010 All-Ireland Senior Hurling Championship was the 114th staging of Ireland's premier hurling competition since its establishment by the Gaelic Athletic Association in 1887. A total of thirteen teams competed in the championship, with Tipperary unseating the four-time defending champions Kilkenny by 4-17 to 1-18 in the final at Croke Park, Dublin.  The championship began on 22 May 2010 and concluded on 5 September 2010.

Pre-championship
The build-up to the opening of the championship was dominated by Kilkenny and the 'drive for five'. 'The Cats' were installed as the bookies' favourites to retain the All-Ireland title for an unprecedented fifth successive occasion. Since 2006 the Kilkenny team had come to be regarded as arguably the greatest hurling team of all-time. In 2007, they surpassed their greatest rivals Cork at the top of the all-time roll of honour, while in 2009 the team equalled the seemingly unbeatable record of four All-Ireland titles in-a-row. Winning an elusive five-in-a-row would close the argument on hurling's greatest team.

Tipperary were regarded as the primary challengers to Kilkenny's dominance. Many believed that they had the beating of Kilkenny in the previous year's All-Ireland final, however, 'the Cats' pulled away in the last ten minutes to seal the victory. With an extra year of experience many felt that Tipp may finally triumph for the first time in nine years.

A second tier of teams waited just behind the two clear front-runners. Perennial hopefuls Galway entered the championship as the newly crowned National Hurling League champions and were also seen as a stumbling block on Kilkenny's march to immortality. The westerners were regarded as potential Leinster and maybe even All-Ireland finalists. Cork were buoyed by some impressive displays in the National League. 'The Rebels' defeated both Kilkenny and Tipperary in the group stages and finished the campaign as runners-up. Similarly, Cork enjoyed a trouble-free winter and would enter the championship without any off-field controversy. Waterford were also viewed as a team that had the potential to make life difficult for any of the other top-tier teams.

Limerick entered the championship in the midst of a crisis. After team manager Justin McCarthy dropped twelve players from the panel in October 2009, many of the remaining players decided to withdraw their services over the course of the next few months.  The crisis developed into something of a 'civil war' with the vast majority of the 2009 panel remaining 'on strike', while McCarthy was retained as manager and developed a new panel of players for 2010.  The result was Limerick losing all of their National League matches and being relegated to Division 2.

The championship

Participating counties

Format
The 2010 All-Ireland Senior Hurling Championship was run on a provincial basis as usual. It was a knockout tournament with pairings drawn at random in the respective provinces - there were no seeds.

Each match was played as a single leg. If a match was drawn there was a replay. If that match ended in a draw a period of extra time was played, however, if both sides were still level at the end of extra time another replay would take place.

Munster Championship

Quarter-final: (1 match) This is a single match between the first two teams drawn from the province of Munster.

Semi-finals: (2 matches) The winner of the lone quarter-final joins the other three Munster teams to make up the semi-final pairings.

Final: (1 match) The winners of the two semi-finals contest this game.

Leinster Championship

First Round: (1 match) This was a single match between the first two teams drawn from the province of Leinster.

Quarter-finals: (3 matches) The winner of the first-round game joins five other Leinster teams to make up the three quarter-final pairings.

Semi-finals: (2 matches) The winners of the three quarter-finals join Kilkenny, who received a bye to this stage, to make up the semi-final pairings.

Final: (1 match) The winner of the two semi-finals contest this game.

Qualifiers

The qualifiers gave teams defeated in the provincial championships another chance at winning the All-Ireland.

Preliminary Round (1 match): the five teams who fail to reach a provincial semi-final will enter the qualifiers at this stage. The first two teams drawn will play each other in the preliminary round with the winner of that match joining the other three teams in Phase 1.

Phase 1: (2 matches) The winner of the preliminary round and the other three remaining teams will play off. The two winners enter Phase 3.

Phase 2: (2 matches) The two beaten Leinster semi-finalists will play the two beaten Munster semi-finalists. The two winners enter Phase 3.

Phase 3: (2 matches) The four winners of Phase 1 and Phase 2 games meet in Phase 3. The two winners advance to the All-Ireland quarter-finals.

All-Ireland Series

Quarter-finals: (2 matches) The beaten Munster and Leinster finalists will play the winners of the Phase 3 qualifiers.

Semi-finals: (2 matches) The Munster and Leinster champions will play the winners of the quarter-finals.

Final: (1 match) The two semi-final winners will contest the final.

Leinster Senior Hurling Championship

Munster Senior Hurling Championship

All-Ireland Qualifiers

Preliminary round

Phase 1

Phase 2

Phase 3

All-Ireland Senior Hurling Championship

Quarter-finals

Semi-finals

Final

Statistics

Player facts
Debutants
The following players made their début in the 2010 senior championship:

Retirees
The following players played their last game in the 2010 championship:

Scoring
First goal of the championship: Joe Fitzpatrick for Laois against Carlow (Leinster First Round)
Last goal of the championship: Lar Corbett for Tipperary against Kilkenny (All-Ireland Final)
Widest winning margin: 19 points
Kilkenny 4-19 - 0-12 Dublin (Leinster Semi Final)
Most goals in a match: 6
Galway 3-16 - 3-17 Tipperary (All-Ireland Quarter Final)
Most points in a match: 44
Cork 1-25 - 0-19 Antrim (All-Ireland Quarter Final)
Most goals by one team in a match: 4
Kilkenny 4-19 - 0-12 Dublin (Leinster Semi Final)
Tipperary 4-17 - 1-18 Kilkenny (All-Ireland Final)
Most goals scored by a losing team: 3
Antrim 3-16 - 2-26 Offaly (Leinster Quarter Final)
Laois 3-12 - 1-19 Carlow (Qualifiers Preliminary Round)
Antrim 2-18 - 3-12 Carlow (Qualifiers Phase 1)
Galway 3-16 - 3-17 Tipperary (All-Ireland Quarter Final)
Most points scored by a losing team: 19
Wexford 0-19 - 3-24 Tipperary (Qualifiers Phase 1)
Antrim 1-17 - 0-19 Dublin (Qualifiers Phase 3)
Cork 1-25 - 0-19 Antrim (All-Ireland Quarter Final)
Kilkenny 3-22 - 0-19 Cork (All-Ireland Semi Final)

Miscellaneous
 In the Leinster quarter-final Galway defeat Wexford for the first time in the history of the championship.
 Kilkenny's Henry Shefflin scores twelve points against Dublin in the Leinster semi-final to become the highest-scoring player in the history of the championship.  The record was previously held by Shefflin's fellow county man Eddie Keher and had stood since 1973.
 In the All-Ireland qualifiers Antrim defeat Dublin for the first time in the history of the championship.
 Lar Corbett becomes the first player since Eddie O'Brien in 1970 to score a hat-trick of goals in an All-Ireland final.

Discipline
 First yellow card of the season: Richard Coady for Carlow against Laois (22 May 2010)
 First red card of the season: Eoin Costelloe for Laois against Carlow (22 May 2010)

Top scorers
Overall

Single game

Awards
Monthly

Managerial changes
The following managerial changes took place during the championship.

References

External links
All-Ireland Senior Hurling Championship 2010 Results

2010 in hurling